Grey Towers was a house in Hornchurch, England

Grey Towers can also refer to:
Grey Towers Castle, Arcadia University, Glenside, Pennsylvania
Grey Towers National Historic Site, Dingman Township